is an English company law case, concerning piercing the corporate veil for fraud.

Together with the subsequent decision of the Supreme Court later the same year in  the Supreme Court substantially restated the English company law position in relation to piercing of the corporate veil.

Facts
VTB Capital plc claimed that Nutritek, its parent and a director called Konstantin Malofeev, fraudulently misrepresented the value of dairy companies that Nutritek was selling to Russagroprom LLC. VTB was giving a $225m loan to Russagroprom to buy the dairy companies. VTB claimed that it was deceived into thinking that Russagroprom was not already under common control with Nutritek. It additionally sought to hold the owner of Nutritek, Marshall Capital Holdings, Marshall Capital LLC and the alleged controller, Konstantin Malofeev all jointly liable because of their control of Nutritek. VTB Capital was a subsidiary of the Russian state owned bank called JSC VTB Bank, but the loan facility agreement was expressed to be governed by English law. Russagroprom defaulted on the loan, and only $40m was recovered. VTB sought to amend to add claims that the court should pierce the veil of Russagroprom to make the defendants liable under the facility agreement.

Judgment

High Court
Arnold J refused permission to amend and serve the proceedings out of the jurisdiction, because England was not demonstrated to be the appropriate forum. It discharged the freezing injunction that was obtained against Malofeev.

Court of Appeal
The Court of Appeal dismissed the appeal. Lloyd LJ gave the judgment. Rimer LJ and Aikens LJ concurred.

Supreme Court
The Supreme Court dismissed the appeal, Lord Mance giving the leading judgment, and holding that England was not the appropriate forum. Although the High Court had erred in interpreting Spiliada Maritime Corp v Cansulex Ltd [1987] AC 460, this did not effect its ultimate conclusion because its error favoured VTB. The High Court wrongly concluded that Russian law governed the alleged torts, but it had considered the position if English law had been applicable and found this not to be favourable. The Court of Appeal also erred in finding Russian law applicable for the torts and did not recognise the significance of the governing law, but this would not have changed the conclusion. The High Court’s exercise of discretion could not be faulted or set aside. It was unnecessary to resolve whether the court could not pierce the veil but this could not succeed in any case. The allegation would be an extension of existing law, so that there could be piercing if someone controlled a company, as if they had been a co-contracting partner. A strong justification would be required, and there was an overwhelming case against extension because the law provided redress against the controller in a misrepresentation action. It would be wrong to treat another defendant as party to the contract where none of the actual parties had intended this. The facts did not involve Russagroprom being used as a facade to conceal true facts. The worldwide freezing injunction would be discharged, and it was unsatisfactory given the length of litigation.

Lord Neuberger gave a concurring judgment. While not technically necessary, he said the following on piercing the corporate veil.

Lord Wilson concurred with Lord Mance and Lord Neuberger. He said the following on the corporate veil point.

Lord Clarke gave a judgment, dissenting on the question of forum, while reserving any comments on the corporate veil for a future case.

Lord Reed dissented regarding forum, and agreed with Lord Neuberger there were strong reasons against piercing the veil.

See also

UK company law

Notes

References

United Kingdom company case law
Supreme Court of the United Kingdom cases
2013 in British law
2013 in case law